Killer Gorilla is a clone of Donkey Kong written by Adrian Stephens and published by Micro Power for the BBC Micro in 1983. It was ported to the Acorn Electron and Amstrad CPC computers in 1984.

Stephens wrote Killer Gorilla at the age of 17 after buying a magazine with screenshots of Donkey Kong.  He was paid 400 pounds for the game. Stephens wrote two other games for Micro Power: Escape From Moonbase Alpha and Mr EE, a clone of Universal's Mr. Do!.

Gameplay
 
The game involves controlling a man to reach a fair-haired heiress trapped by a large gorilla at the top of the screen. It is made up of four levels, set higher and higher up a construction site – 25 m, 50 m, 75 m and 100 m.

There are two hammers on the 25 m, 50 m and 100 m levels, with none on the 75 m level. Hammers last for about 10 seconds, as measured by the amount of bonus that ticks away. You cannot climb ladders or jump gaps when holding the hammer.

After completing the four levels, the player returns to the 25 m level and the game repeats, getting progressively faster and with more barrels, custard pies, and fireballs. In addition, the girders on the 25 m level acquire more holes.

An extra life is awarded when the player completes the 75 m level for the first time.

The character is controlled using Z for left, X for right, and return to jump.

Legacy
The game appeared on a number of compilations including 10 Computer Hits (1985), Micropower Magic 2 (1986) and Superior Software's highly regarded Play It Again Sam 3 (1988). PIAS 3 also included a game called Killer Gorilla 2 but this was actually a re-titled early Superior Software game. Based on Donkey Kong Junior and originally released as Zany Kong Junior in 1984, it was soon withdrawn after a cease and desist from Atarisoft, who owned the home computer rights to the original game. Ironically, Atarisoft had commissioned Adrian Stephens to officially port Donkey Kong Junior to the BBC Micro after seeing Killer Gorilla, but the game was never released as Atarisoft decided to abandon the BBC platform.

References

External links
 How the packaging evolved
 Only the Best BBC Micro Games
 Manual text

1983 video games
Amstrad CPC games
BBC Micro and Acorn Electron games
Micro Power games
Platform games
Single-player video games
Video game clones
Video games about primates
Video games developed in the United Kingdom